Gyula Pados (born 2 April 1969) is a Hungarian cinematographer. He is best known for his collaborations with director Wes Ball on the films Maze Runner: The Scorch Trials, Maze Runner: The Death Cure, and Kingdom of the Planet of the Apes.

Life and career
Pados was born in Budapest, Hungary. In 1990, he attended the Academy of Drama and Film in Budapest as a cinematographer. He worked as a camera assistant to Academy Award-winner Vilmos Zsigmond. As a university student, he and his friends founded a company, which is still the third largest Hungarian commercial film studio. His diploma work was cinematographing and directing Hajnal, for which he was awarded several prizes. Then he cinematographed The dance. Later, he made Angyal utca with a completely Hungarian team. In England, he shot the short movie Meter Running, written by Charles Martin and directed by David Moore. After getting his degree in 1996, he returned to England and shot The Star and The Sin Eater. 

In 2000, he was the cinematographer of Hotel Splendide, which was also awarded. His last movie in England was The Heart of Me. He came back to Hungary in 2003, filming Kontroll, which made him famous also in Hungary. After this movie, he was the cinematographer of the movie Fateless in 2005. 

His first major Hollywood film was Predators (2010), and he has also shot the blockbuster films Maze Runner: The Scorch Trials (2015), Jumanji: Welcome to the Jungle (2017) and its 2019 sequel, and Shazam! Fury of the Gods (2023).

Awards
In 1991 he got the first success with the movie Hajnal ('Dawn'): he won the Grand Prix of the Oberhausen Film Festival, the Wim Wenders Prize at the Munich Film Festival, the Grand Prix of the Potsdam Film Festival and the Main Prize of the Hungarian Film Festival. In 1995 he was awarded for Angyal utca ('Angel Street') at the Munich Film Festival. In 1998 he was awarded Kodak Prize for The Sin Eater at the Locarno International Film Festival. He was nominated Best Cinematographer at the European Film Award for Fateless in 2005. He was awarded best cinematographer at the Sitges Film Festival for Hotel Splendide in 2000, at the Copenhagen International Film Festival and the Silver Camera Prize at the Brothers Manaki International Film Festival for Kontroll in 2003 and at Satellite Award for Best Cinematography for The Duchess in 2008.

Filmography

Short films

References

External links
 
 Gyula Pados at cinematographers.nl

Hungarian cinematographers
Living people
1969 births
Film people from Budapest